The Tale of Tsar Saltan is a poem by Aleksandr Pushkin. It may also refer to:

 The Tale of Tsar Saltan (opera), opera by Nikolai Rimsky-Korsakov
 The Tale of Tsar Saltan (1966 film), 1966 Russian film
 The Tale of Tsar Saltan (1984 film), 1984 animated Russian film